The Diocese of Santiago de María is a Latin Church ecclesiastical territory or diocese of the Catholic Church in El Salvador. It is a suffragan diocese in the ecclesiastical province of the metropolitan Archdiocese of San Salvador. The Diocese of Santiago de María was erected on 2 December 1954.

Ordinaries
Francisco José Castro y Ramírez (1956–1974)
Óscar Arnulfo Romero y Galdámez (1974–1977), appointed Archbishop of San Salvador
Arturo Rivera Damas, S.D.B. (1977–1983), appointed Archbishop of San Salvador
Rodrigo Orlando Cabrera Cuéllar (1983–2016)
William Ernesto Iraheta Rivera (2016– )

References

External links
 

Santiago de Maria
Santiago de Maria
Santiago de Maria
1954 establishments in El Salvador
Santiago de María